Dr. Eliza Cook (February 5, 1856 – October 2, 1947) was an American physician and Nevada's first state-licensed woman doctor. She also worked as a pharmacist and wrote articles about health issues for magazines and medical journals.

Biography
Cook was born on February 5, 1856, in Salt Lake City, Utah to John and Margaretta Gratrix Cook. Her mother, Margaretta, left her father due to his stinginess and his belief in polygamy. In 1870, Eliza, her mother, and Eliza’s sister Rebecca moved to Sheridan, Nevada. Without a school to attend, Eliza was educated by her mother and whatever books she could find. One book, the title of which is unknown, was about home remedies and got her interested in medicine. 

A doctor, H. W. Smith, hired Cook to help nurse his wife when she had puerperal fever. Cook’s skills impressed him so much that he hired her as his assistant. This gave her access to his medical library, where she read everything she could read. 

Cook received her Medical Degree in 1884 from Cooper Medical College (Stanford University Medical Department) in San Francisco. In 1891 she  attended the Women's Medical College of Philadelphia and the following summer tool a post graduate course at the Medical College in New York City.  She was granted her Nevada medical license in April 1899, the first year that they were issued by the state. 

As a doctor, she performed surgeries, set broken limbs, and delivered many babies. She also worked as a pharmacist and wrote articles about health issues for magazines and medical journals.

Cook was a member of the American Woman Suffrage Association and the Women's Christian Temperance Union. In October of 1895, she was a founding member of the Nevada Women’s Equal Suffrage League and elected the inaugural vice president of the organization. After her term was over, she became president of the Douglas County Equal Suffrage League, and continued to serve both organizations by circulating petitions, writing to legislators, and publishing letters in the newspapers. She served as Vice President of the Nevada Equal Suffrage Association. 

Never married, she resided in Mottsville, Carson Valley, and Douglas County. Cook died on October 2, 1947. Cook is buried Mottsville Cemetery in Douglas, Nevada.

References

1856 births
1947 deaths
People from Salt Lake City
Stanford University School of Medicine alumni
Physicians from Nevada
American women physicians
American suffragists
People from Douglas County, Nevada
19th-century American physicians